Watching Angels Mend is the second studio album by Alex Lloyd. It was released on 17 September 2001 by EMI Records.

At the ARIA Music Awards of 2002, Lloyd was nominated for seven awards, and won ARIA Award for Best Male Artist.

Reception

Daniel Werner from CMJ called the album "one of Australia's biggest homegrown albums of 2002" and "a serious contender for record of the year".

Track listing
All tracks written by A. Wasiliev, except where noted.

 "Everybody's Laughing"
 "Green"
 "Trigger"
 "My Friend"
 "Lost in the Rain"
 "Sleep"
 "Amazing"
 "Downtown"
 "Bus Ride" (A. Wasiliev/S. Miller)
 "Burn"
 "Easy Exit Station"

Charts

Weekly charts

Year-end charts

Certification

Personnel
Alex Lloyd - guitar, vocals, programming, keys, bass
Magnus Fiennes - programming, keys, string arrangement
BJ Cole - pedal steel guitar
The Weatherman - programming, drums, percussion
Ric Featherstone - Programming
Brian Gascoigne - string conductor
Tom Windriff - vocals, drums, percussion
Sedsil Top - vocals
Bernard Fanning - vocals
Sharon Finn - vocals
Lorna Marshall - vocals
Dean Tidey - guitar
Graham Kearns - guitar
William South - piano, Hammond organ
Jim Hayden - keys
Guy Pratt - bass
Shawn Lee - drums, percussion
Clive Deamer - drums, percussion
Ged Lynch - drums, percussion

References

2001 albums
Alex Lloyd albums
ARIA Award-winning albums
Albums recorded at Rockfield Studios